Nosfell (born 1 December 1977 in Saint-Ouen, France) is a French rock musician who performs in a group with Pierre Lebourgeois (cellist) and Orkhan Murat (drummer). His full stage name, Labyala Fela Da Jawid Fel, means "The one who walks and heals".

Career 
Born in the Parisian suburbia, Nosfell studied Asian languages but became famous as a cabaret performer and musician. He played major venues including the Paris Olympia, opening for Tryo, and the Parc des Princes, opening for the Red Hot Chili Peppers and Pixies. At the Printemps de Bourges music festival he was awarded the "Attention talent scène" prize. His first self-promoted LP, Pomaïe Klokochazia balek, was released in 2004, and he then signed to record label V2 Records. He released two further albums, Kälin Bla Lemsnit Dünfel Labyanit (2006) and Nosfell (2009).

Music 
Nosfell's musical influences include blues, folk, funk, African music, scat, human beatbox, and other traditions. His work is characterised by his use of a distinctive invented language, "Klokobetz", which may be based on Japanese and German. He also sings in English and French.

His third album, Nosfell (produced by Alain Johannes), displays clearer rock influences than his other works. Josh Homme, Brody Dalle and Daniel Darc guest star on two of the songs. The album's release was accompanied by the publication of a book, Le Lac aux Velies, which Nosfell wrote with Ludovic Debeurme to elaborate the stories he narrates on stage.

Discography

Albums 
2003: Khayidilo  (Album EP)
2005: Pomaïe Klokochazia balek
2006: Live in Bruxelles (Pomaïe Klokochazia balek, with live DVD)
2007: Kälin Bla Lemsnit Dünfel Labyanit
2009: Nosfell
2011: Octopus
2014: Amour Massif
2014: Contact

DVD 
2006: Oklamindalofan, Live in Bruxelles in Brussels, 15 December 2005.

Book 
2009: Le Lac aux Vélies (with Ludovic Debeurme's drawings), 25 June 2009

External links 
 Official Site

Unofficial sites
  Nosfell.eu
  Biography

References 

French rock guitarists
French male guitarists
French rock singers
French people of Algerian descent
French people of Spanish descent
French people of Italian descent
1977 births
Living people
21st-century French singers
21st-century guitarists
21st-century French male singers